Irmina Mrózek Gliszczyńska (born 9 February 1992) is a Polish competitive sailor. She competed at the 2016 Summer Olympics in Rio de Janeiro, in the women's 470 class.

References

1992 births
Living people
Polish female sailors (sport)
Olympic sailors of Poland
Sailors at the 2016 Summer Olympics – 470
470 class world champions
World champions in sailing for Poland
People from Chojnice